Episode is the fifth studio album by power metal band Stratovarius, released on 22 April 1996 through Noise Records. It is the first Stratovarius album to feature keyboardist Jens Johansson and drummer Jörg Michael, both of whom would form part of the band's most stable line-up for nine years. The album reached No. 21 on the Finnish albums chart and remained on that chart for six weeks.

Track listing

Personnel

Timo Kotipelto – lead vocals
Timo Tolkki – guitar, background vocals, arrangement (except track 12), engineering, mixing, production
Jens Johansson – keyboards
Jörg Michael – drums
Jari Kainulainen – bass guitar
Pasi Puolakka – flute
Sibelius String Orchestra – strings
Sibelius Choir – choir
Pop/Jazz Conservatory Choir – choir
Reijo Harvonen – conducting, arrangement (track 12)
Kimmo Blom – background vocals
Richard Johnson – background vocals
Marko Vaara – background vocals
Richard Johnson – vocal consultation, lyrical consultation
Timo Oksala – engineering
Rene Siren – engineering
Erol Sakir – tape operation
Mikko Karmila – mixing
Mika Jussila – mastering

Chart performance

References

External links
Episode at stratovarius.com

Stratovarius albums
1996 albums
Noise Records albums